NcFTP is an FTP client program which debuted in 1990 as the first alternative FTP client. It was created as an alternative to the standard UNIX ftp program, and offers a number of additional features and greater ease of use.

NcFTP is a command-line user interface program, and runs on a large number of platforms.

See also 
 NcFTPd
 Lftp
 Comparison of FTP client software
 Wget

References 

 Peter Leung (March 14, 2006) Upload directories recursively with NcFTP, Linux.com
 Richard Petersen, Fedora 7 & Red Hat Enterprise Linux: the complete reference, Edition 4, McGraw-Hill Professional, 2007, p. 342
 Karl Kopper, The Linux Enterprise Cluster: build a highly available cluster with commodity hardware and free software, No Starch Press, 2005, pp. 369–371

External links 
 
 IBM - NcFTP: The flexible FTP client
 Debian - Details of package ncftp in jessie

Free FTP clients
1991 software
Free software programmed in C